The Partita for keyboard No. 2 in C minor, BWV 826, is a suite of six movements written for the harpsichord by Johann Sebastian Bach. It was announced in 1727, issued individually, and then published as Bach's Clavier-Übung I in 1731.

Musical structure 
This partita consists of six movements:

References

Sources

External links
 

Suites by Johann Sebastian Bach
Compositions for harpsichord